Living in a Giant Candle Winking at God is the debut album by the Transit Kings.  It featured guest appearances from The Smiths guitarist Johnny Marr and comedian Simon Day. The Times called it "Orb-lite" and proclaimed it to be "Deep Forest-style sludge".

Though Jimmy Cauty left the Transit Kings before the release of Living in a Giant Candle Winking at God, he received a credit as composer on seven of the album's tracks.

Track listing
"The West End Of A Duck Going East" (6:12) 
"Stop Over (Dance With Me)" (0:10) 
"Concourse" (7:16) 
Vocals - Juliet Russell  
"Boom (Bombay)" (5:42) 
Vocals - Missy MC  
"Oh Shit" (4:02) 
Strings" - Chi3  
"Baby Don't" (5:17) 
Trumpet, Flugel - Quentin Collins  
"Japanese Cars (Album Mix)" (4:56) 
"Free Free" (8:08) 
Strings - Chi3 
Vocals - Jonathan Kydd, Juliet Russell, William Butler Yeats  
"Blooze Tracks" (5:19) 
"America Is Unavailable" (Album Mix) (5:21) 
Guitar - Johnny Marr  
"Wagon Wheels" (6:06) 
Trumpet, Flugel - Quentin Collins  
"The Last Lighthouse Keeper" (6:38) 
Vocals - Simon Day
Extra Tracks on the Japanese release:
"Butterflies" (4:31)
"America is Unavailable" [sss ding dong mix] (4:41)

References

2006 debut albums